Bara is a constituency of the Uttar Pradesh Legislative Assembly covering the city of Bara in the Allahabad district of Uttar Pradesh, India.

Bara is one of five assembly constituencies in the Allahabad. Since 2008, this assembly constituency is numbered 264 amongst 403 constituencies.

Election results

2022

2017
Bharatiya Janta Party candidate Dr. Ajai Kumar won in 2017 Uttar Pradesh Legislative Elections defeating Samajwadi Party candidate Ajay by a margin of 34,053 votes.

2012
Samajwadi Party candidate Dr. Ajay Kumar defeated BJP candidate Vibhavnath Bharti.

References

External links
 

Assembly constituencies of Uttar Pradesh
Politics of Allahabad district